The following is a list of Sites of Special Scientific Interest in the South Perth  Area of Search, in Scotland. For other areas, see List of SSSIs by Area of Search.

 Back Burn Wood and Meadows
 Bishop Hill
 Black Loch (Cleish)
 Bog Wood and Meadow
 Carey
 Carsebreck and Rhynd Lochs
 Craig Rossie
 Devon Gorge
 Drummond Lochs
 Dupplin Lochs
 Gartwhinzean Meadow
 Glen Queich
 Gleneagles Mire
 Inner Tay Estuary
 Kincardine Castle Wood
 Lady Loch
 Loch Leven
 Lurg and Dow Lochs
 Methven Moss
 Pitkeathly Mires
 Quoigs Meadow
 Turflundie Wood
 Wether Hill

Geography of Perth, Scotland
 
South Perth